Gaudin is a French surname. Notable people with the surname include:

 André Gaudin, a French rower
 Antoine Marc Gaudin (1900–1974), an American engineer
 Chad Gaudin (born 1983), an American baseball player
 Christian Gaudin (politician) (born 1950), a member of the Senate of France
 Christian Gaudin (handballer) (born 1967), a French team handball player
 Clark Gaudin (born 1931), an American politician
 Damien Gaudin (born 1986), a French cyclist
 Henri Gaudin (born 1933), French architect
 Jean-Claude Gaudin (born 1939), former mayor of Marseille
 Jean François Aimé Théophile Philippe Gaudin (1766-1833), a Swiss pastor, professor and botanist
 Jean Gaudin (1879–1954), French painter, glass and mosaic artist 
 Lucien Gaudin (1886–1934), French fencer and Olympic medalist
 Martin-Michel-Charles Gaudin (1756–1841), duc de Gaete, a French Minister of Finances
 Marc Antoine Auguste Gaudin (1804–1880), a French chemistry researcher and inventor of an air vacuum pump
 Thibaud Gaudin (c. 1229–1292), a Grand Master of the Knights Templar

See also 
 Godin (disambiguation)

French-language surnames